Nicholas Bradshawe (fl. 1635), was a fellow of Balliol College, Oxford. He was the author of Canticvm Evangelicvm Summam Sacri Evangelii continens, London, 1635, dedicated to Sir Arthur Mainwaring.

References

17th-century English writers
17th-century English male writers
Fellows of Balliol College, Oxford
Year of birth missing
Year of death missing